Stone Mountain High School is a college preparatory and public high school located in unincorporated DeKalb County, Georgia, United States, near Stone Mountain and in the Atlanta metropolitan area.

Its attendance boundary includes all of Stone Mountain.

History
It is one of the oldest high schools in the DeKalb County School District.

Notable alumni

 Jarren Benton, professional rapper
 6lack, professional rapper, singer, and songwriter
 Robert Carswell, former professional football player for the San Diego Chargers
 Callix Crabbe, former professional baseball player for the San Diego Padres
 Ukeme Eligwe, professional football player for the Kansas City Chiefs
 Fast Life Yungstaz, Rap trio 
Andrew Goudelock (born 1988), basketball player for Maccabi Tel Aviv of the Israeli Premier League and the Euroleague
 Tamyra Gray, actress and singer, top ten finalist on American Idol
 D. Richard Hipp, software developer and the primary author of SQLite and Fossil SCM
 Connie Johnson, former professional baseball player for the Chicago White Sox and  Baltimore Orioles
 RonReaco Lee, Actor, Sister Sister, Guess Who, Survivor's Remorse
 Katherine Lee-Hinton, Delta Air Lines flight attendant who was one of the presenters of Delta's onboard safety videos and quickly became popular not only on board but also on YouTube soon after.
 Cord Parks, former professional football player
 Kelly Quinn, former professional football player
 Damon Russell, Oscar winning producer Curfew, Director of Snow on da Bluff
 Mitch Sutton, former professional football player
 Swizz Beatz, record producer
 Josh Symonette, football player
 Hugh Thompson, Jr., United States Army, Vietnam War veteran who attempted to stop the My Lai Massacre

References

External links
 Stone Mountain High School
 

DeKalb County School District high schools
Stone Mountain
1909 establishments in Georgia (U.S. state)
Educational institutions established in 1909